Lake Mary is a lake in Crow Wing County, in the U.S. state of Minnesota.

According to Warren Upham, Lake Mary was probably named of the daughter or wife of a pioneer lumberman.

See also
List of lakes in Minnesota

References

Lakes of Minnesota
Lakes of Crow Wing County, Minnesota